This is a summary of 1915 in music in the United Kingdom.

Events
March – The Musical Times publishes an appreciation of Frederick Delius by the composer Peter Warlock (Philip Heseltine).
December – Having been invalided out of the armed forces, composer Havergal Brian and his family move to Erdington, Warwickshire.
date unknown
Composer Herbert Howells is given six months to live, and becomes the first person in the UK to receive radium treatment (he will live on until 1983).
William Penfro Rowlands's hymn tune "Blaenwern" is first published in Henry H. Jones' Cân a Moliant.
The Band of the Welsh Guards is formed, simultaneously with the establishment of the regiment.

Popular music
Albert William Ketèlbey – "In a Monastery Garden" 
T. W. Conner – "A Little Bit of Cucumber"  
George Henry Powell & Felix Powell – "Pack Up Your Troubles in Your Old Kit-Bag"

Classical music: new works
Granville Bantock – Hebridean Symphony
Frank Bridge – Lament
Dora Bright – A Dancer's Adventure (ballet) 
Frederick Delius – Double Concerto for violin, cello and orchestra
Edward Elgar – Incidental music for The Starlight Express
Gustav Holst – Japanese Suite
John Ireland – Preludes for Piano
Percy Pitt
Sakura suite No. 2 (Suite de Ballet)
Ballet Egyptien
Suite pour petite orchestre

Opera
Rutland Boughton – Bethlehem

Musical theatre
24 April – Betty, with lyrics by Adrian Ross and music by Paul Rubens, opens at Daly's Theatre, starring Winifred Barnes.
28 April – Tonight's the Night, with lyrics by Percy Greenbank and music by Paul Rubens, opens at Daly's Theatre, featuring George Grossmith and Leslie Henson.

Births
11 January – Harry Lewis, musician and composer (died 1998)
25 January – Ewan MacColl, folk singer and songwriter (died 1989)
4 February – Norman Wisdom, comedian, singer and actor (died 2010)
10 March – Charles Groves, conductor (died 1992)
19 March – Nancy Evans, operatic mezzo-soprano (died 2000)
25 March – Dorothy Squires, singer (died 1998)
29 March – George Chisholm, jazz trombonist and comedian (died 1997)
26 August – Humphrey Searle, composer (died 1982)
28 November – Pamela Harrison, pianist and composer (died 1990)

Deaths
15 January – Florence Everilda Goodeve, composer and lyricist, 53
4 June – William Denis Browne, pianist, organist and composer, 26 (killed in action)
6 June – William Hayman Cummings, tenor, organist and composer, 83
10 December – David Jenkins, composer, 66

See also
 1915 in the United Kingdom

References

British Music, 1915 in
Music
British music by year
1910s in British music